The Petrov Affair was a Cold War spy incident in Australia, concerning the defection of Vladimir Petrov, a KGB officer, from the Soviet embassy in Canberra in 1954. The defection led to a Royal Commission and the resulting controversy contributed to the Australian Labor Party split of 1955.

Background 
Petrov, despite his relatively junior diplomatic status, was a colonel in (what became in 1954) the KGB, the Soviet secret police, and his wife was an officer at the Ministry of Internal Affairs (MVD). The Petrovs had been sent to the Canberra embassy in 1951 by the Soviet security chief, Lavrentiy Beria. After Joseph Stalin's death in March 1953, Beria had been arrested and shot by Stalin's successors, and Vladimir Petrov evidently feared that, if he returned to the Soviet Union, he would be purged as a "Beria man".

Defection 
Petrov made contact with the Australian Security Intelligence Organisation (ASIO) and offered to provide evidence of Soviet espionage in exchange for political asylum. The defection was arranged by Michael Bialoguski, a Polish doctor and musician, and part-time ASIO agent, who had cultivated Petrov for nearly two years, befriending him and taking him to visit prostitutes in Sydney's King's Cross area. Bialoguski introduced Petrov to a senior ASIO officer, Ron Richards, who offered Petrov asylum plus £5,000 in exchange for all the documents he could bring with him from the embassy. Planning for Petrov's defection was codenamed Operation Cabin 12, after a briefer period of being designated Operation Cabin 11, following the standard practice of referring to potential defectors as "Cabin Candidates". Petrov defected on 3 April 1954.

Evdokia Petrova 
Petrov did not tell his wife Evdokia of his intentions; apparently he planned to defect without her. After falsely claiming that Australian authorities had kidnapped Petrov, the MVD sent two couriers to Australia to fetch Evdokia Petrova. Word of this leaked out and on 19 April there were violent anti-Communist demonstrations at Sydney Airport as Evdokia Petrova was escorted by the KGB men to the aircraft. On the plane, on radioed instructions from Prime Minister Robert Menzies, a flight attendant asked her if she was happy being escorted back to the USSR, but she did not give a clear answer, as she was racked with indecision –  defection could have severe consequences for her family in the USSR. Menzies decided that he could not allow her to be removed in this way, and when the aircraft stopped for refuelling at Darwin Airport, she was seized from the MVD men by ASIO officials. (In order to separate Petrova from the MVD, the ASIO officials confronted them on the grounds that they were carrying arms, which it was illegal to do on an aircraft.) The ASIO officials offered Petrova asylum, which she accepted, after speaking to her husband by phone. By now it was the early hours of 20 April 1954.

These dramatic events were flashed around the world giving immediate sense to a world public of the real life drama that was at pitch and occurring. The photos of Evdokia Petrova being rough-handled by KGB agents at Sydney Airport and her agonised last-moment decision to defect with her husband, made at Darwin Airport, have become iconic Australian images of the 1950s.

Royal Commission 

The affair grew more dramatic when Menzies told the House of Representatives that Petrov had brought with him documents concerning Soviet espionage in Australia. He announced that a Royal Commission would investigate the matter, the Royal Commission on Espionage. Petrov's documents were shown to the commission members, though they were never made public. The documents were alleged to provide evidence of an extensive Soviet spy ring in Australia, and named (among many others), two staff members of the leader of the Australian Labor Party, Dr. H. V. Evatt, during proceedings. Evatt, a former justice of the High Court of Australia and the third President of the United Nations General Assembly, appeared before the Royal Commission as counsel for his staff members. His cross-examination of a key ASIO operative transformed the commission's hearings and greatly perturbed the government. Almost immediately, the Royal Commission simply withdrew Evatt's leave to appear. Evatt alleged that the judges of the commission were biased towards the Menzies' government in the wake of this unprecedented denial of his right to appear.

Another person who was questioned at length (over a week) about his activities and associations was Ric Throssell, a diplomat and former adviser to Evatt.  His mother, the writer Katharine Susannah Prichard, was a committed Communist, and it was strongly suggested he had at least inadvertently, if not wittingly, given her classified information, as well as actively spying for the Soviet Union.  The final report did not uphold these charges, but his career from then on was blighted by these suspicions.

Aftermath and legacy 
As a result of the defections, the Australian embassy in Moscow was expelled and the USSR embassy in Canberra recalled. Diplomatic relations were not re-established until 13 March 1959.

Political repercussions 

The defections came shortly before the 1954 federal election. Evatt accused Menzies of having arranged the defections to coincide with the election, for the benefit of the incumbent Liberal Party.

According to some, partly as a result of the Petrov Affair, Menzies was successful at the election, which Labor had been widely expected to win. The Royal Commission continued for the rest of 1954 and uncovered some evidence of espionage for the Soviet Union by some members and supporters of the Communist Party of Australia during and immediately after World War II, but no-one was ever charged with an offence as a result of the commission's work and no major spy ring was uncovered. (No one was charged for various reasons: one was given immunity from prosecution, others who had handled documents had not technically broken the law, one was in Prague and remained there, and evidence against others could not be presented because it would reveal that Western intelligence services had broken Soviet codes).

Evatt's loss of the election and his belief that Menzies had conspired with ASIO to contrive Petrov's defection led to criticism within the Labor Party of his decision to appear before the Royal Commission. He compounded this by writing to the Soviet Foreign Minister, Vyacheslav Molotov, asking if allegations of Soviet espionage in Australia were true. When Molotov replied, denying the allegations, Evatt read the letter out in Parliament, inviting amazement and ridicule from his opponents.

Evatt's actions aroused the anger of the right wing of the Labor Party, influenced by the Catholic anti-Communism of B. A. Santamaria and his clandestine "Movement". Evatt came to believe that the Movement was also part of the conspiracy against him, and publicly denounced Santamaria and his supporters in October 1954, leading to a major split in the Labor Party, which did not win office again until 1972.

Fate of the Petrovs 
The Petrovs, having been given political asylum, were eventually settled in suburban Melbourne under the names Sven and Maria Allyson, and given a pension. Prior to this, they spent an 18-month period in a safe house in Palm Beach, Sydney, with the then ASIO officer Michael Thwaites, who ghost-wrote their memoirs, published in 1956 as Empire of Fear.

They lived in relative obscurity for the rest of their lives. The press was formally requested by the Department of Defence, by way of a D-Notice, not to reveal their identities or whereabouts, but this was not always honoured. Vladimir died in 1991 and Evdokia in 2002.

Retrospection 
The belief that there had been a "Petrov conspiracy" became an article of faith in the Labor Party and on the left generally for many years, although even pro-Labor historians acknowledged that Evatt's eccentric conduct had contributed greatly to the Labor split. The "left" version of the Petrov story was given in 1974 in Nest of Traitors: The Petrov Affair, by Nicholas Whitlam (son of Gough Whitlam, who was Labor Prime Minister at the time of publication) and John Stubbs. This book was written without access to classified documents.

Menzies always denied that he had had advance knowledge of Petrov's defection, although he did not deny that he had exploited it and Cold War anti-Communist sentiment. Colonel Charles Spry, head of ASIO at the time, when interviewed after his retirement, maintained that, although it had taken some months of negotiations to bring about Petrov's defection, he had not told Menzies about these negotiations and that the timing of the defection had no connection to the elections.

In 1984, the ASIO files on Petrov and the records of the Royal Commission were made available to historians. In 1987, the historian Robert Manne published The Petrov Affair: Politics and Espionage, which gave the first full account of the affair. He showed that Evatt's suspicions were unfounded, that Menzies and Spry had been telling the truth, that there had been no conspiracy, and that Evatt's own conduct had been mainly responsible for subsequent political events.

But Manne also showed that although there had been some Soviet espionage in Australia, there was no major Soviet spy ring, and that most of the documents given by Petrov to ASIO contained little more than political gossip which could have been compiled by any journalist. This included the notorious "Document J", which had been written by Rupert Lockwood, a member of the Communist Party of Australia expressing his beliefs on the matter. Page 35 of the document sourced the information to Evatt's staffers, Fergan O’Sullivan, Albert Grundeman, and Allan Dalziel. Evatt insisted that page 35 was misinformation added specifically to damage the Australian Labor Party. He managed to prove that his staff had not authored the document. The Royal Commission concluded that Document J was entirely Lockwood's work.

Fictional works 

The Petrov Affair has inspired a number of fictional works, many of which have won awards.

 The Petrov Affair, a 1987 television mini-series.
 The Red Shoe, a novel by Ursula Dubosarsky, which won the New South Wales Premier's Literary Award and the Queensland Premier's Literary Award in 2006.
 Mrs Petrov's Shoe, a play by Noelle Janaczewska, which won the Queensland Premier's Literary Award for drama in 2006.
 The Safe House, an animation by Lee Whitmore, narrated by Noni Hazlehurst, which won Best Animation at the Sydney Film Festival 2006.
 Document Z, a novel by Andrew Croome, which won the Australian/Vogel Literary Award in 2008.
The Petrov Poems, a 2013 verse-novel by Lesley Lebkowicz.  This book was shortlisted for the 2014 ACT Book of the Year Award and won the 2014 ACT Writing and Publishing Awards: Poetry Book Category.

See also 
 Australia–Russia relations

 Gouzenko Affair -  A similar defection by a Soviet official in Canada in 1945

References

Further reading 
 Vladimir and Evdokia Petrov, Empire of Fear, Frederick A. Praeger, New York, 1956 (these memoirs were ghost-written for the Petrovs by the then ASIO officer Michael Thwaites)
 Nicholas Whitlam and John Stubbs, Nest of Traitors: The Petrov Affair, University of Queensland Press, Brisbane, 1974
 Michael Thwaites, Truth Will Out: ASIO and the Petrovs, William Collins, Sydney, 1980
 Robert Manne, The Petrov Affair: Politics and Espionage, Pergamon Press, Sydney, 1987
 Ursula Dubosarsky, The Red Shoe, Allen and Unwin, Sydney, 2006
 Rowan Cahill. "Rupert Lockwood (1908–1997): Journalist, Communist, Intellectual", Doctor of Philosophy thesis, School of History and Politics, University of Wollongong, 2013 
 Andrew Croome, Document Z, Allen and Unwin, Sydney, 2009
 Ann Curthoys and John Merritt (editors), Australia's First Cold War, 1945-59, Vol. II : 'Better Dead Than Red' , Chapter 6: "A Labor Myth?", Allen & Unwin, 1986

External links 
 Mrs Petrov's death brings bizarre affair to end – an article by Robert Manne in The Age newspaper
 Cahill, Rowan, "The Making of a Communist Journalist: Rupert Lockwood, 1908–1940", Working Lives, 2003. Account of the career development of the journalist associated with authorship of Document J.
 Neely, Francesca, Clio History Journal, 2010.
  ozhistorybytes – Issue Eight. Peter Cochrane.  [National Centre for History Education, homepage http://www.hyperhistory.org/]

1954 in Australia
Communism in Australia
Political controversies in Australia
Cold War history of Australia
Foreign relations of Australia
Espionage scandals and incidents
Australia–Soviet Union relations
Foreign relations of the Soviet Union
1954 in politics
History of Darwin, Northern Territory
Defection
Articles containing video clips
Menzies Government (1949–66)
1950s in Sydney
20th century in Canberra
20th century in Darwin, Northern Territory
1950s in the Northern Territory